Sarah Felder (born 20 March 1956) is an Italian luger. She competed at the 1972 Winter Olympics and the 1976 Winter Olympics.

References

External links
 

1956 births
Living people
Italian female lugers
Olympic lugers of Italy
Lugers at the 1972 Winter Olympics
Lugers at the 1976 Winter Olympics
People from Olang
Sportspeople from Südtirol